Wavetable may refer to:

 Wavetable synthesis, a sound synthesis technique used to create periodic waveforms often used in music synthesizers
 Sample-based synthesis, a form of audio synthesis using sampled sounds or instruments

See also
 Waveform, the shape of an acoustic or electronic signal's graph as a function of time
 Digital waveguide synthesis, the synthesis of audio using a digital waveguide
 Lookup table, an array that replaces runtime computation